Rocky Mount (also Rockymount) is an unincorporated community in Bossier Parish, Louisiana, United States.

Notable people
Jesse C. Deen, Louisiana politician, lived in Rocky Mount; Deen was an agriculture teacher and coach at the Rocky Mount High School in Rocky Mount.
William Clark Hughes, Louisiana politician, was born in Rocky Mount.

References

Unincorporated communities in Bossier Parish, Louisiana
Unincorporated communities in Louisiana